Temporal may refer to:

Entertainment
 Temporal (band), an Australian metal band
 Temporal (Radio Tarifa album), 1997
 Temporal (Love Spirals Downwards album), 2000
 Temporal (Isis album), 2012
 Temporal (video game), a 2008 freeware platform and puzzle game
 Temporal (film), a 2022 Sri Lankan short film

Philosophy
 Temporality
 Temporal actual entity, see

Other
 An alternative for lateral, in the head; towards the temporal bone
 Temporality (ecclesiastical), or temporal goods, secular possessions of the Church

See also
 
 Ephemeral
 Impermanence
 Temporal region (disambiguation)